Laying out might be used to describe:
Marking out, the process of transferring a design or pattern to a workpiece
Laying out the dead, also known as last offices